François-René Tranchefort (? – 22 May 2019) was a contemporary French musicologist.

Biography 
Tranchefort has written, edited or directed, alone or in collaboration with other musicologists, a number of reference works on a wide range of themes related to classical music: chamber music, symphonic music, piano, harpsichord, opera, sacred music, choral, and musical instruments. Among others, he has collaborated with Harry Halbreich, Marc Vignal, Pierre-Émile Barbier, Adélaïde de Place, André Lischke, Jean-Alexandre Ménétrier, Alain Poirier, Jean-Louis Sulmon, Claire Delamarche, Michel Fleury, Erik Kocevar, Marie-Aude Roux, and Michel Parouty.

Selected bibliography 
1978:  L'opéra 1, d'Orféo à Tristan, series "Points", éditions du Seuil
1978:  L'opéra 2, de Tristan à nos jours, series Points, éditions du Seuil
1980: Les instruments de musique dans le monde 1, Coll. « Points » (n° Mu 5), éditions du Seuil. Instruments de percussions, cordes.
1980: Les instruments de musique dans le monde 2, series "Points" (n° Mu 6), éditions du Seuil. Instruments à vent, électriques et électroniques mécaniques et automatiques.
1983: L'Opéra, éditions du Seuil.
  — Prize of the Académie Charles-Cros.

References

External links 
 François-René Tranchefort on Babelio

20th-century French musicologists
2019 deaths
Year of birth missing